Haydenoceras is a genus of middle Devonian cephalopods originally placed in the Barrandeocerida. The genus can be recognized by its strongly compressed, gradually expanding exogastrically curved shell with a strongly rounded dorsum and acutely angled venter, calling attention to the general form of earlier Bassleroceras. The siphuncle is tubular, central.

Related genera include Avilionella, Barrandeoceras, Gasconsoceras, Laureloceras, and Savageoceras.

References

 Walter C. Sweet 1964.  Natiloidea - Barrandeocerida, Treatise on Invertebrate Paleontology Part K. Geological Society of America and University of Kansas Press.

Prehistoric nautiloid genera
Tarphycerida